The 1953 Tourist Trophy may refer to the following races:
 The 1953 Isle of Man TT, for Grand Prix Motorcycles
 The 1953 RAC Tourist Trophy, for sports cars held at Dundrod
 The 1953 Dutch TT, for Grand Prix Motorcycles held at Assen